Joon, also Jun is commonly Chinese given last name written as 俊 in Southeast Asia such as Malaysia and Singapore and less commonly used in China and Taiwan. Currently there are no records of how many people are named Joon.

List of Chinese given name Joon
 Cheong Jun Hoong(張俊虹) - Malaysian diver.
 Mak Joon Wah Dr. Mak Joon Wah is a Malaysian physician.
 Liu Jun (刘隽) - Malaysian choreographer, dancer and singer.
 Leong Jun Hao (梁峻豪) - is a Malaysian badminton player.
 Wen Junhui (文俊辉) -  professionally known by his stage name Jun (준), is a Chinese singer, rapper, dancer, actor, model and songwriter based in South Korea.
 Lin Jun Wen (林俊杰) -  better known by his stage name JJ Lin, is a Singaporean singer, songwriter, record producer, and actor.
 Yeo Jun Wei (姚俊威 or 杨俊伟)
 Gong Jun (龚俊) - also known as Simon Gong, is a Chinese actor and model.
 Hu Jun (胡軍) -  Chinese actor best known for playing dramatic roles in various films and television series.
 Lin Yanjun (林彦俊) - also known as Evan Lin, is a Taiwanese singer, rapper and actor.
 Di Jun (帝俊) - also known as Emperor Jun is one of the ancient supreme deities of China.
 Zhu Jun (host) (朱军) - also known as Deon Zhu is a Chinese host and actor.

Chinese masculine given names